Maqdisi is an Arabic nisba referring to a Jerusalemite. It is derived from Bayt al-Maqdis, an Arabic name for Jerusalem, by way of the Hebrew Beit HaMikdash, the Temple in Jerusalem. Today, the common Arabic name of Jerusalem is al-Quds.

Al-Maqdisi is used as an appellative to refer to a number of people, including:

Abd al-Ghani al-Maqdisi, classical Palestinian Sunni Islamic scholar
Al-Maqdisi, medieval Arab geographer born in Jerusalem
Abu Muhammad al-Maqdisi, contemporary Jordanian-Palestinian Salafi Islamist scholar
Diya al-Din al-Maqdisi, a Hanbali Islamic scholar
Ibn Qudamah, Imam Mawaffaq ad-Din Abdullah Ibn Ahmad Ibn Qudama al-Maqdisi, a Hanbali Islamic scholar
Kamel al-Budeiri, governor of Ramla district during the later Ottoman period
Hisham Al-Saedni, known by the nom de guerre Abu al-Walid al-Maqdisi, founder of the militant group Mujahideen Shura Council in the Environs of Jerusalem

See also 
Qudsi (disambiguation)
Muqaddas (disambiguation)
Al-Quds (disambiguation)
Arabic name

Arabic-language surnames
Nisbas
Arabic words and phrases
Toponymic surnames
People from Jerusalem

de:Al-Maqdisi